The Lyndhurst Plantation is a historic slave plantation in unincorporated Jefferson County, Florida. On April 2, 1973, it was added to the U.S. National Register of Historic Places.

References

External links

 Jefferson County listings at National Register of Historic Places
 Jefferson County listings at Florida's Office of Cultural and Historical Programs

Houses on the National Register of Historic Places in Florida
National Register of Historic Places in Jefferson County, Florida
Plantations in Jefferson County, Florida

Houses in Jefferson County, Florida